The 1928 New York Giants season was the franchise's 46th season. The team finished in second place in the National League with a 93–61 record, 2 games behind the St. Louis Cardinals.

Offseason 
 January 10, 1928: Rogers Hornsby was traded by the Giants to the Boston Braves for Shanty Hogan and Jimmy Welsh.

Regular season

Season standings

Record vs. opponents

Roster

Player stats

Batting

Starters by position 
Note: Pos = Position; G = Games played; AB = At bats; H = Hits; Avg. = Batting average; HR = Home runs; RBI = Runs batted in

Other batters 
Note: G = Games played; AB = At bats; H = Hits; Avg. = Batting average; HR = Home runs; RBI = Runs batted in

Pitching

Starting pitchers 
Note: G = Games pitched; IP = Innings pitched; W = Wins; L = Losses; ERA = Earned run average; SO = Strikeouts

Other pitchers 
Note: G = Games pitched; IP = Innings pitched; W = Wins; L = Losses; ERA = Earned run average; SO = Strikeouts

Relief pitchers 
Note: G = Games pitched; W = Wins; L = Losses; SV = Saves; ERA = Earned run average; SO = Strikeouts

Farm system

Notes

References 
1928 New York Giants season at Baseball Reference

New York Giants (NL)
San Francisco Giants seasons
New York Giants season
New York
1920s in Manhattan
Washington Heights, Manhattan